Miguel Olavide Montes (born 5 March 1996) is a Spanish professional footballer who plays for CD El Ejido as a midfielder.

Football career
Born in Pamplona, Navarre, Olavide graduated from CA Osasuna's youth setup. He made his senior debuts with the reserves in the 2013–14 campaign in the Tercera División.

On 15 November 2014 Olavide made his first-team debut, replacing fellow youth graduate Maikel Mesa in a 0–1 home loss against SD Ponferradina in the Segunda División, being also sent off in the 89th minute. The following 29 August, he renewed his contract until 2019.

Olavide contributed with 30 appearances during the 2015–16 season, as his side achieved promotion to La Liga through the play-offs. He made his debut in the category on 22 September 2016, replacing Álex Berenguer in a 1–2 home loss against RCD Espanyol.

On 7 May 2017, Olavide scored his first professional goal, but in a 1–4 loss at Valencia CF. On 29 August, he extended his contract until 2019 and was immediately loaned to Sevilla Atlético in the second division, for one year.

Honours
Osasuna
Segunda División: 2018–19

References

External links

1996 births
Living people
Footballers from Pamplona
Spanish footballers
Association football midfielders
La Liga players
Segunda División players
Segunda División B players
Tercera División players
CA Osasuna B players
CA Osasuna players
Sevilla Atlético players
Hércules CF players
CD El Ejido players